Meneshau is a rural locality (a settlement) in Bolshemogoysky Selsoviet of Volodarsky District, Astrakhan Oblast, Russia. The population was 116 as of 2010. There is 1 street.

Geography 
Meneshau is located 11 km south of Volodarsky (the district's administrative centre) by road. Boldyrevo is the nearest rural locality.

References 

Rural localities in Volodarsky District, Astrakhan Oblast